Camilla Patrizia "Milly" Carlucci (born 1 October 1954) is an Italian television presenter, actress and singer. Carlucci played the role of Urania in the 1985 film The Adventures of Hercules. In 1996 she became a Goodwill Ambassador for UNICEF. Since 2005 she has been the sole host of Ballando con le Stelle ('Dancing with the Stars'), the Italian version of Strictly Come Dancing. In 2009 she became the first woman to host the Miss Italia beauty pageant.

Filmography

Awards

References

External links

Milly Carlucci bio at Rai 1 (Italian)

1954 births
Living people
Italian television personalities
Italian actresses
Italian women singers
People from Sulmona
UNICEF Goodwill Ambassadors